The 1987 Belgian Cup Final, took place on 14 June 1987 between Mechelen and RFC Liège. It was the 32nd Belgian Cup final. Mechelen won the match with 1–0.

Route to the final

Match

Details

External links
  

1987
Cup Final
K.V. Mechelen matches